The yellow tree frog is a species of frog in the family Rhacophoridae endemic to the southern Western Ghats, India.

Yellow tree frog may also refer to:

 Hispaniolan yellow tree frog, a frog found in the Dominican Republic and Haiti
 Oaxacan yellow tree frog, a frog endemic to Mexico

See also

 Yellow-spotted tree frog

Animal common name disambiguation pages